The Price of Sugar may refer to:

 The Price of Sugar (2007 film), documentary
 The Price of Sugar (2013 film), Dutch film